Tropidieae is an orchid tribe in the subfamily Epidendroideae.

See also
 Taxonomy of the Orchidaceae

References

External links

 
Epidendroideae tribes